Vitalie Zlatan (born 8 April 1993, Chișinău, Moldova) is a Moldavian football striker who plays for FC Iskra-Stal.

Club statistics
Total matches played in Moldavian First League: 14 matches – 3 goals

References

External links

Profile at Divizia Nationala
Profile at Iskra-Stal FC

1991 births
Living people
Footballers from Chișinău
FC Sfîntul Gheorghe players
FC Iskra-Stal players
Moldovan footballers
Moldovan expatriate footballers
Association football forwards